Ajo Peak is a mountain peak in southern Arizona, in the north-and-east Sonoran Desert.

Ajo, Arizona in the central-east of the mountains; (named in Spanish for garlic), is the access point for the entire central areas of the Little Ajo Mountains, including Ajo Peak.

Water divide mountain range
Ajo Peak as part of the Little Ajo Mountains forms part of a water divide, and splits into three directions – (a "Triple Divide"), part of two drainages. The Growler Valley and the San Cristobal Wash Drainage go south-west-north from the Ajo Peaks; also northwest; these two directions skirt the Little Ajo and Growler Mountain ranges. The second drainage goes from the northeast, is northwest trending through the east perimeter of the Childs Valley and forms the headwaters to the Tenmile Wash Drainage. Both drainages disappear into the ground before reaching the Gila River Valley.

See also
 List of mountain ranges of Arizona

References

External links
 San Cristobal Wash Watershed Map – showing Ajo on east-and-southerly
 Tenmile Wash Watershed Map – showing Ajo on the southwest

Landforms of Pima County, Arizona
Mountains of Pima County, Arizona